Christopher Schewe (also known as Shoenice) is an American comedian, competitive eater, and YouTuber.

Biography 
He was born in Albany, New York on May 30, 1969 he was a veteran in the army. 

His YouTube channel was started by his son on April 11, 2008and he recorded himself eating a piece of paper as a prank before eventually becoming viral for filming himself eating other things. He would eat raw eggs, burgers with the wrapping paper, Vegimite, and toilet paper for the purpose of “stopping world hunger”, and he managed racked up over 200,000 subscribers on his original channel while gaining a huge following. 

He also started chugging large amounts of alcohol, especially vodka.This has led to skeptics thinking he may have staged his videos. He protested with students at University at Albany following the suspension of Fountain Day in Pittstown in 2011.

In 2013, he set the Guinness World Record for eating the most lit birthday cake candles in 1 minute and 12 seconds.

He quit drinking in 2018 due to fear of dying from alcohol poisoning and went back to eating regular food and objects on his newer channel.

References 

1969 births
American competitive eaters
American YouTubers
Food and cooking YouTubers
Living people
Prank YouTubers